Aslam Khan may refer to:

 Aslam Khan (cricketer) (1935–1980), Indian cricketer
 Aslam Khan (Pakistani brigadier) (1918–1994), Pakistani military officer in the First Kashmir War
 Aslam Sher Khan (born 1953), Indian hockey player
 Aslam Khan (firefighter), who died during the 1967 Hong Kong riots while attempting to defuse a bomb

See also
 Chaudhry Aslam Khan (1967–2014), Pakistani police officer
 Mohammad Aslam Khan (disambiguation)
 Muhammad Aslam Khan (1923–1994), Pakistani army officer
 Uzma Aslam Khan (born 1969), Pakistani writer